Good Mood is the fifth studio album by Australian indie pop band Ball Park Music. The album was released on 16 February 2018. The album peaked at number 5 on the ARIA Charts. The band promoted the album with a national tour in February and March 2018. It was the first album to have song-writing contributions by guitarist Dean Hanson.

At the ARIA Music Awards of 2018, the album was nominated for three awards; Producer of the Year, Engineer of the Year and Best Cover Art.

Recording and production
The album was recorded at the band's studio located in an industrial estate in Stafford in Brisbane, named the Bunnings Warehouse Recording Studio, and produced by the band. It was engineered by Cromack, mixed by Paul McKercher and mastered by William Bowden.

On the song-writing, Cromack said, "I put some rules on myself: everything had to have the classic verse-chorus-verse-chorus pop structure. I had a ball. And with my lyrics I was like, 'For God's sake, Sam, be clear about what you want to say!'. So often we look down on pop music, but the rules didn't crush our creativity."

Cover
The photo on the cover was taken by Dean Hanson, who said, "It was maybe a couple of months into the recording, we were sitting in the studio one morning… Sam came in and showed us a few images he’d seen of horses rearing in cool places and we thought it was a powerful image. As we always do, come out with ridiculous ideas, we thought it’d be an amazing album cover if we could get someone to rear their horse in front of the garage door of our studio."

Critical response
The Sydney Morning Herald said, "Opening with the poppy, yet summery laid-back feel of "The End Times", this self-produced album brings studio whiz and ARIA award-winner Paul McKercher into the mix, elevating frontman/guitarist Sam Cromack's vocals to a new level and highlighting his lyrical strength." The Herald Sun claimed, "The experimentation and attention to sonic detail here (it's a headphones album) makes this their Pet Sounds", and compared "The End Times" to, "a ragged Go-Betweens-style indie gem".

The Australian noted, "the affable plain-spokenness, the facility for melodies that can cure a vitamin D deficiency and, yes, the festival-friendly anthems with unabashedly broad appeal" and declared it their best album.

Track listing

Charts

References

2018 albums
Ball Park Music albums
Prawn Records albums